Episparis penetrata is a species of moth in the family Erebidae first described by Francis Walker in 1857.

Distribution 
The species is found in Cameroon, the Democratic Republic of the Congo, Equatorial Guinea, Gabon, Nigeria and Sierra Leone.

References

External links 
"Episparis penetrata Walker, 1857". African Moths. With images.

Pangraptinae